"Do-Do's & Whoa-Oh's" is the first single taken from Australian rock band Kisschasy's debut album, United Paper People (2005). It was released on 4 July 2005 and peaked at number 25 on the Australian Singles Chart. The single was nominated for "Best Breakthrough Artist – Single" in the 2005 ARIA awards. The music video features the band on an ice skating rink, spontaneously appearing and moving around the rink.

Track listing

Charts

Release history

References

2005 singles
2005 songs
Kisschasy songs
Song recordings produced by Phil McKellar